Danguolė is a Lithuanian feminine given name. People bearing the name Danguolė include:
Danguolė Brogienė (born 1959), Lithuanian textile designer
Danguolė Rasalaitė (1983–2000), Lithuanian girl who made headlines after being sold into sexual slavery
Danguolė Raudonikienė (born 1937), Lithuanian painter

References

Lithuanian feminine given names